Districts are the second level administrative divisions of Sri Lanka, preceded by provinces. Sri Lanka has 25 districts organized into 9 provinces. Districts are further divided into a number of divisional secretariats (commonly known as D.S. divisions), which are in turn subdivided into 14,022 grama niladhari divisions. There are 331 DS divisions in Sri Lanka.

Each district is administered under a district secretary, who is appointed by the central government. The main tasks of the district secretariat involve coordinating communications and activities of the central government and divisional secretariats. The district secretariat is also responsible for implementing and monitoring development projects at the district level and assisting lower-level subdivisions in their activities, as well as revenue collection and coordination of elections in the district.

History
The country was first divided into several administrative units during the Anuradhapura Kingdom. The kingdom was divided into three provinces; Rajarata, Ruhuna and Malaya Rata. These were further subdivided into smaller units called rata. Over time, the number of provinces increased, but the second-level administrative division continued to be the rata. However, with the country eventually being divided into more than one kingdom and with foreign colonial missions landing and taking parts of the country under their control, this structure began to change. The territory of the Kotte Kingdom was organized into four , which were further subdivided into forty . The  had their own civil and military officials with a small militia. The Jaffna kingdom appears to have had a similar administrative structure to this with four provinces.

When the Portuguese took over parts of the country after their arrival in 1505, they maintained more or less the same administrative structure followed by Sri Lankan rulers. During the Dutch rule in the country, the terrain under their control was divided into three administrative divisions. These were subdivided into  as in earlier systems. The British initially continued this system, but following reforms in 1796 to 1802, the country was divided according to ethnic composition. This was abolished by the Colebrook–Cameron reforms in 1833 and a legislative council was created, making the island a politically and administratively single unit. Five provinces were created, later expanded into nine, and these were subdivided into twenty-one districts. These districts were administered by officials known as Government Agents or Assistant Government Agents.

In 1955, the district replaced the province as the country's main administrative unit. The Ampara District was created in April 1961, followed by the creation of the Mullaitivu and Gampaha districts in September 1978 through a new constitution, which also reintroduced the provinces as the main administrative units. The newest district to be created was the Kilinochchi district in February 1984, and the current constitution states that the territory of Sri Lanka consists of 25 administrative districts. These districts may be subdivided or amalgamated by a resolution of the Parliament of Sri Lanka.

Districts
All population data is from the most recent census of Sri Lanka, in 2012.

See also
 ISO 3166-2:LK

Notes

Citations

References

External links

 

 
Sri Lanka 2
Districts
Lists of places in Sri Lanka
Districts, Sri Lanka